Dorsum Gast is a wrinkle ridge at  in Mare Serenitatis on the Moon. It is 65 km long and was named after American geochemist and geologist Paul Werner Gast in 1973.

References

External links
LAC-41
LTO-41B3 Joy, Lunar Topographic Orthophotomap (shows northern Dorsum Gast)
LTO-41C2 Galen, Lunar Topographic Orthophotomap (shows southern Dorsum Gast)

Ridges on the Moon
Mare Serenitatis